Caron is both a surname and a given name. Notable people with the name include:

Surname:
Adolphe-Philippe Caron (1843–1908), Canadian lawyer and politician
Alain Caron (born 1955), Canadian jazz bassist
Alain Caron (1938–1986), Canadian ice hockey player
Alcides Sagarra Carón (born 1936), Cuban boxing trainer
Alexis Caron (1764–1827), Canadian lawyer and politician
Alexis Pierre Caron (1899–1966), Canadian politician
Amy Caron (born 1984), American professional skateboarder
André Caron (1944–1997), Canadian politician
André H. Caron, Canadian communication scholar
Annie Caron (born 1964), Canadian footballer
Annie Caron (born 1941), French Olympic swimmer
Antoine Caron (1521–1599), Mannerist painter to the court of the House of Valois
Arthur Caron (1883–1914), French Canadian failed assassin
Augustin Caron (1778–1862), Canadian farmer and politician
Augustin Joseph Caron (1774-1822), French lieutenant colonel
Aymeric Caron (born 1971), French journalist
Benjamin Caron (born 1976), British film and television director
Bernard Caron (born 1952), French football player and manager
Blossom Caron (1905–1999), Canadian photographer
Charles Caron (1768–1853), Canadian farmer
Christine "Kiki" Caron (born 1948), French Olympic swimmer
Daniel J. Caron (born 1957), national librarian, Library and Archives Canada
David D. Caron (1952–2018), American attorney
Delio Caron (1924–2002), Italian rugby league footballer
Djina Caron, Canadian make-up artist
Édouard Caron (1830–1900), Canadian politician
Estelle Caron (1926–2010), Québécois singer and comedian
Eugène-Charles Caron (1834–1903), French baritone
Firminus Caron (fl. 1460–1475), French Renaissance composer
Francine Caron (born 1945), French writer and poet
François Caron (1600–1673), French Huguenot refugee to Netherlands, part of Dutch East India Company, director general at Batavia, later director general of French East India Company
François Caron (politician) (1766–1848), representative of Saint-Maurice in the Legislative Assembly of Lower Canada
François Michel Marie Ignace Caron (born 1937), French Navy officer and historian
George Caron (1823–1902), member of Canadian Parliament
George Robert "Bob" Caron (1919–1995), Enola Gay tail gunner
Gérard Caron (1938–2020), French designer
Gérard Caron (1916–1986), Canadian pianist
Germain Caron (1910–1966), Canadian politician
Gilles Caron (1939–1970), French photographer
Giuseppe Caron (1904–1998), Italian politician
Glenn Gordon Caron (born 1954), American film and television writer
Guy Caron (born 1968), Canadian politician
Hector Caron (1862–1937), Canadian politician
Henri Caron (1924–2002), French racewalker
Henri Caron (1906–?), French racing cyclist
Hipólito Boaventura Caron (1862–1892), Brazilian painter
Jacques Joseph Caron (born 1940), Canadian ice hockey coach
Jean-Baptiste Thomas Caron (1869–1944), Canadian lawyer
Jean-Bernard Caron, French Canadian paleontologist
Jean-Claude Caron (1944–2021), French actor
Jean-François Caron (born 1957), French politician
Jean-Francois Caron (born 1982), Canadian strongman and powerlifter
Jean-Luc Caron (born 1948), French physician and musicologist
Jocelyn "Jo" Caron, Canadian production sound mixer
Jocelyne Caron (born 1951), Canadian politician
Jordan Julien Caron (born 1990), Canadian ice hockey forward
Joseph Caron (born 1947), former Canadian high commissioner to India, former ambassador to China and Japan
Joseph Caron (1868–1954), Canadian politician
Joseph-Édouard Caron (1866–1930), Canadian politician
Joseph-Georges Caron (1896–1956), Canadian politician
Joseph-Napoléon Caron (1896–1970), Canadian politician and hardware store owner
Joseph Le Caron (1586–1632), Franciscan missionary to Canada
Kevin Caron (born 1960), American sculptor
Leslie Caron (born 1931), French actress and dancer
Louis Caron (born 1942), Canadian journalist
Louis-Bonaventure Caron (1828–1915), Canadian lawyer and politician
Lucien Caron (1929–2003), Canadian politician
Marc Caron (born 1954), Canadian military Chief of Staff
Marc G. Caron (1946–2022), Canadian-born American neuroscientist and professor
Marcel Caron (1890–1961), Belgian painter
Marie-Josèphe Caron (1725-1784), French artist
Max Caron (born 1989), Canadian football linebacker
Maxence Caron (born 1976), French philosopher
Michel Caron (1763–1831), Canadian politician
Michel Caron (born 1942), Canadian pop singer
Michel Caron (1929–2001), French opera singer
Nadine Rena Caron (born 1970), Canadian surgeon
Nia Caron, Welsh television actress
Pascal Caron (born 1972), Canadian Olympic bobsledder
Pierre Caron (1900–1971), French film director
Pierre Caron (1875–1952), French historian and archivist
Pierre Caron (born 1936), Liberal party member of the Canadian House of Commons
Pierre-Luc Caron (born 1993), Canadian football player
Raymond Caron (1605–1666), Irish Franciscan
René-Édouard Caron (1800–1876), Canadian politician
Robert Caron, Canadian sociologist
Roger Caron (born 1962), American football coach and player
Roger Caron (born 1957), Canadian sport shooter
Roger "Mad Dog" Caron (1938–2012), Canadian bank robber and author
Ronald "Ron" Caron (1929-2012), Canadian NHL executive
Rose Caron (1857–1930), French operatic soprano
Sébastien Caron (born 1980), French-Canadian NHL goaltender
Stéphan Caron (born 1966), French swimmer
Suzanne Caron, Canadian mayor of Mount Royal
Tom Caron (born 1963), American sportscaster
Vincent Caron, Canadian politician
Wayne Maurice Caron (1946–1968), American hospital corpsman killed in Vietnam
Yves Caron (born 1937), Canadian salesperson and politician

Given name:
Caron Bernstein (born 1970), South African model
Caron Bowman, Afro-Honduran American artist
Caron Butler (born 1980), American basketball player
Caron Keating (1962–2004), Northern Irish TV presenter
Caron Wheeler (born 1963), British R'n'B/soul singer

See also

Carlon